Lawrence Silas (born 1891) was a cattle baron in Florida. He was African American. Silas has a permanent place in the Florida state museum exhibit "Florida's Black Cowboys: Past and Present".

History 
Silas's father, Thomas Silas, was a former slave who worked for various cattlemen after moving from Georgia to Kenansville, Florida. He built a ranch, eventually expanded to span 2,000 acres. The elder Silas died in 1909 when Lawrence was 18 years old. Lawrence, his 12 siblings, and mother saw the family's holdings deteriorate as the elder Silas left no will. The entire family then moved to Kissimmee, and Lawrence Silas began anew, building his own ranch and herd.

While many blacks worked throughout the Florida cattle industry, Silas was demonstrably the most successful. He died in 1974 at the age of 82. As he had no male heirs to give his business, his herds were sold off.

In Kissimmee, Lawrence Silas Boulevard is named after the cattleman.

References

African-American businesspeople
1891 births
Year of death missing
American cattlemen
African-American history of Florida